Chatkalite is a copper, iron, tin sulfide mineral with formula Cu6Fe2+Sn6S8. It crystallizes in the tetragonal crystal system and forms as rounded disseminations within tetrahedrite in quartz veins.

Physical properties

Chatkalite can have sizes ranging from rounded grains of about 100 micron when found within a tetrahedrite. It has a metallic luster, a hardness of 274 on the Vickers scale and a hardness of 4.5 on the Mohs scale. It has a color of pale rose in reflected light with no internal reflection. Its diaphaneity can be described as opaque. It does not exhibit any cleavage or twinning properties. Chatkalite is anisotropic which is characteristic of the stannite group. Its anisotropic intensity is a weak shade of brown.

Occurrences

Chatkalite was first located in the sulfide bearing quartz veins of the Chatkal-Kuramin Mountains in eastern Uzbekistan in 1981. Chatkalite has also been located in few other places since then namely Ubertad Mine, Quirulvica Province of Santiago de Chuco, Peru, Mine McCoy, McCoy district, Lander County, Nevada US and Eugenia Maria Vein, Cerro Shortcut, Catamarca, Argentina. A few other minerals are also closely associated to chatkalite based on locality, these are cassiterite, hermisite and hessite.

Unique characteristics

One of the rare characteristic of chatkalite is the fact that it has quaternary Bravais lattice metric singularity along with mawsonite. This means that there are four different lattices with three different symmetries that are all consistent with the same set of d spacings. The mineral chatkalite and mawsonite are considered highly specialized because they can produce cubic I tetragonal P, orthorhombic F, and orthorhombic P lattices.

Etymology

Chatkalite was discovered in 1981 around the Chatkal Mountains of Uzbekistan in an unknown locality. It was given the name chatkalite because of this region where it was discovered.

References

Further reading

Anthony, J. W. (19902003). Handbook of mineralogy. Tucson, Ariz.: Mineral Data Pub.
Bohmer, H. (1964). Introduction. Mineralogy of the tetrahedrite series (p. 12). Ann Arbor : UMI Dissertation publishing.
Chatkal valley. (n.d.). . The nature that could steal your heart. Retrieved November 3, 2013, from https://web.archive.org/web/20131216042007/http://www.people-travels.com/uzbekistan-cities/tashkent/chatkal.html

Sulfide minerals
Tetragonal minerals
Minerals in space group 115